Tagelus californianus, common name California tagelus, is a species of saltwater clams, marine bivalve mollusks belonging to the family Solecurtidae.

Distribution
This species can be found in the Eastern Pacific from Gulf of California to Oregon.

Description
These shells are yellowish-white, with rust-colored stains and a dark periostracum. The posterior margin is slightly sinuous.

References

Coan, E. V.; Valentich-Scott, P. (2012). Bivalve seashells of tropical West America. Marine bivalve mollusks from Baja California to northern Peru. 2 vols, 1258 pp

Solecurtidae
Bivalves described in 1837